Thomas Broadus "Dad" Amis (August 26, 1895 – October 14, 1964) was an American football and basketball coach.  He was the third head football coach at Howard Payne University in Brownwood, Texas, serving for four seasons, from 1924 to 1927, and compiling a record of 25–12–2. Amis played college football for William Alexander's Georgia Tech Golden Tornado.

Amis was born in  Newnan, Georgia.  He died on October 14, 1964, at a hospital in Newberry, South Carolina, following a short illness.

Head coaching record

Football

References

External links
 

1895 births
1964 deaths
People from Newnan, Georgia
Sportspeople from the Atlanta metropolitan area
Players of American football from Georgia (U.S. state)
American football centers
Georgia Tech Yellow Jackets football players
Coaches of American football from Georgia (U.S. state)
Howard Payne Yellow Jackets football coaches
Furman Paladins football coaches
Basketball coaches from Georgia (U.S. state)
Howard Payne Yellow Jackets men's basketball coaches
Howard Payne Yellow Jackets athletic directors
Furman Paladins athletic directors